Senkelle Swayne's Hartebeest Sanctuary is a protected area in the Oromia Region (or kilil) of Ethiopia, dedicated especially to the protection of the Swayne's hartebeest (Alcelaphus buselaphus swaynei). Covering 54 square kilometers, the reserve is located some 10 kilometers south of the Shashemene-Arba Minch road near the town of Aje.

Although the sanctuary was set aside to protect the largest population of Swayne's hartebeest in Ethiopia, a mammal endemic to the country, the original herd of 3,000 animals has dwindled to a few hundred due to poaching. Nevertheless, according to the travel writer Philip Briggs "the small size of the reserve and open terrain make it the one place in Ethiopia where Swayne's hartebeest sightings are practically guaranteed."

Notes 

Wildlife sanctuaries of Ethiopia
Protected areas of Oromia Region
Somali Acacia-Commiphora bushlands and thickets